The West Bengal Film Journalists' Association Award for Best Female Playback Singer is given yearly by WBFJA as a part of its annual West Bengal Film Journalists' Association Awards for Bengali films, to recognize the best female singer of the previous year.

Superlatives

List of winners
 2017 Iman Chakraborty – "Tumi Jaake Bhalobasho" from Praktan
 Madhubanti Bagchi - "Tomake Chai" from Gangster
 Shreya Ghoshal - "Tomake Chuye Dilam" from Bastu-Shaap
 2018 Chandrani Banerjee - "Tomake Bujhina Priyo" from Projapoti Biskut
 Nikhita Gandhi - "Bangali Maacher Jhol" from Maacher Jhol
 Nikhita Gandhi - "Tomra Ekhono Ki" from Meghnad Badh Rahasya
 Lagnajita Chakraborty – "Ebhabe Golpo Hok" from Bibaho Diaries
 Somchanda Bhattacharya - "Agomonir Gaan" from Durga Sohay
 Shalmali Kholgade - "Aladdin" from One
 2019 Nikhita Gandhi - "Saiyo re" from Uronchondi
 Lagnajita Chakraborty – "Ora Moner Gopon" from Ghare And Baire
 Surangana Bandyopadhyay - "Aaloshyo" from Uma
 Amrita Singh - "Bhule Jeo" from Generation Ami
 Paloma Majumder - "Lokkhiti" from Drishtikone
 Sahana Bajpaie - "Maharajo" from Ek Je Chhilo Raja
 Shreya Ghoshal - "Esho Hey" from Ek Je Chhilo Raja
 2021 Surangana Bandopadhyay for "Kon Gopone" from Brahma Janen Gopon Kommoti
 2022 Shreya Ghoshal for "Kachhe Thako" from Prem Tame
 2023 Shreya Ghoshal for "Bhalobashar Morshum" from X=Prem

See also
 West Bengal Film Journalists' Association Awards
 Cinema of India

References

Indian music awards
West Bengal awards
Year of establishment missing